The Enovate ME5 is an plug-in hybrid electric compact crossover SUV by Enovate. It is positioned below the slightly larger and claimed to be mid-sized Enovate ME7. The production ME5 started sales on 27th August, 2021.

Before the ME5 was unveiled, Enovate registered the Enoreve brand name as a more patent-unencumbered option, while the brand remains to be Enovate.

Overview

The ME5 has a petrol range extender called the iMES Smart Range Extender System, and it is a 1.5L engine with 72kW of power. Combined engine power is 150kW. The ME5 battery capacity is 30.6kWh, and the pure electric range is 155 km. With the range extender, it is capable of going 1012km with a full battery and full tank of fuel.

Specifications
The entry level version of the Enovate ME5 be powered by a 204-PS (201-hp / 150-kW) electric motor plugged into a 30.6-kWh traction battery. In the top of the trim configuration, a 1.5-liter petrol engine unit with 98 hp will come act as a range extender.

Sales
The Enovate ME5 is produced in Enovate’s plant in Changsha, China. In May 2021, Enovate announced a strategic cooperation with Chinese e-commerce giant JD.com in digital marketing of their vehicles and smart product development. The cooperation lead to a luxury limited-edition Jingdong special edition reportedly being offered for 159,900 yuan. For regular sales, two versions are available at launch, the ME5 1012 with a price of 149,900 yuan ($23,000) and the ME5 1012 Pro with a price of 159,900 yuan ($24,700).

See also
 List of production battery electric vehicles

References

External links

  – official site at Enovate

Production electric cars
Compact sport utility vehicles
Crossover sport utility vehicles
Cars introduced in 2019
2020s cars